McKinley Boykin (born March 24, 1983) is a former American football defensive tackle who played one season in the National Football League. He was signed by the New Orleans Saints as an undrafted free agent in 2006. He played college football at Mississippi.

Boykin was also a member of the Cologne Centurions, Florida Tuskers and Virginia Destroyers.

Professional career

New Orleans Saints
Boykin was allocated by the New Orleans Saints to NFL Europe in the spring of 2007 and played for the Cologne Centurions. He played in three regular season games in the NFL. Boykin tallied up 10 tackles in three games.

Florida Tuskers
Boykin was signed by the Florida Tuskers of the United Football League on August 17.

Virginia Destroyers
He was released on August 29, 2011.

References

External links
Just Sports Stats

1983 births
Living people
Sportspeople from Bessemer, Alabama
Players of American football from Alabama
American football defensive tackles
Ole Miss Rebels football players
New Orleans Saints players
Cologne Centurions (NFL Europe) players
Florida Tuskers players
Virginia Destroyers players
Orlando Predators players